Hengyang is the second largest city of Hunan Province, China. As of the 2020 Chinese census, Its total population was 6,645,243 inhabitants, whom 1,290,715 lived in the built-up (or metro) area consisting of 4 urban districts, Nanyue District not being conurbated yet.

Hengyang is home to University of South China, Hengyang Normal University, and Hunan Institute of Technology, three major provincial public universities in the city.

History

The former name of the city was Hengzhou (Hengchow). This was the capital of a prefecture in the Tang Dynasty's Jiangnan and West Jiangnan circuits. Li Jingxuan was banished to superintendence of Hengzhou after feigning an illness and attempting to usurp control of the legislative bureau at Chang'an against the Gaozong Emperor's wishes in AD 680. Following the AD 705 coup that removed the Empress Wu Zetian from power, her ally Li Jiongxiu was also briefly demoted to superintendence of this province. During the reign of Emperor Muzong, the chancellor Linghu Chu was also demoted to this province for his underlings' alleged corruption.

In the 750s, the superintendent of Hengzhou Chen Xi'ang not only ruled his own region but also used his private army to dominate his nominal superior, the military governor Zhang Weiyi headquartered in Jing Prefecture (modern Jingzhou). Upon Zhang's replacement by the former chancellor Lü Yin in 760, however, Chen was placated and then killed in a surprise attack.

During the reign of the Tang emperor Xizong, Zhou Yue overthrew first the prefect of Hengzhou Xu Hao in 881 and then the agent of the rebel Qin Zongquan in the capital of the Qinhua Circuit at Tan Prefecture (modern Changsha) in 886. Xizong confirmed Zhou Yue in all his posts, renaming his circuit Wu'an. Xizong's brother then gave him additional authority over West Lingnan Circuit (modern Guangxi). Shortly after, in 893, Deng Chune and Lei Man attacked and killed him.

Other superintendents included Qi Ying and Xiao Ye.

After initially falling to agrarian rebels under Yang Shiyuan, Hengzhou was recovered by the lord of Wu'an Ma Yin and formed part of his power base during the collapse of the Tang. He initially supported the Later Liang, then declared himself king (Ma Chu) in his own right during the Five Dynasties and Ten Kingdoms period.

During the Revolt of the Three Feudatories, Wu Sangui declared himself Emperor of the Great Zhou and established an imperial court at Hengzhou in 1678 before dying of illness later that year. His grandson Wu Shifan then retreated to Yunnan, and the Qing recovered Hengzhou the next year.

The Battle of Hengyang was the longest defense of a single city during the Second Sino-Japanese War. When Changsha fell to the Imperial Japanese Army on June 19, 1944, Hengyang became their next target. The reorganized 11th Army, consisting of 10 divisions, four brigades, and over 110,000 men, assumed the task of attacking Hengyang. It was part of the Japanese Ichi-Go offensive.

A Roman Catholic diocese of Hengzhou was established, although periodically suppressed. This was suffragan to the Archbishop of Changsha following its elevation in 1946.

In 2013 Hengyang was the center of a major vote buying scandal where it was found that 56 officials were founded to be complicit in paying lower level local officials for votes. The 56 were subsequently removed from office, and an additional 512 resigned from their positions.

Economy
Hengyang is a busy and growing industrial City and the leading transportation centre of Hunan, linking water, rail, and highway routes. Manufacturing includes: chemicals, agricultural, mining equipment, textiles, paper and processed foods. Lead, zinc, coal, and tin are mined nearby. Hengyang is the second largest city in Hunan province, and is a growing industrial hub and transportation center.

Tourism
Known as the 'Bright Pearl in Southern China' and as 'Wild Goose City' (the latter because of wild geese that used to rest here while flying south for the winter), Hengyang has been the birthplace of many historical figures, such the revolutionist Luo Ronghuan and a noted Ming scholar Wang Fuzhi. The city was badly damaged during World War II and few historical buildings survive in diverse stage of reconstruction, including Shigu Academy, Dragon Tower, Confucian School on the Dongzhou Island, Laiyan Pagoda and Nantai Temple. Mount Heng, one of the Five Sacred Mountains, lies 45 kilometres north from the city proper.

Climate
Hengyang has a humid subtropical climate (Köppen Cfa), with four distinct seasons. Spring is subject to heavy rainfall, while the summers are long, hot, and humid with lesser rainfall, and autumn is comfortable and rather dry. Winter is rather brief, but cold snaps occur with temperatures occasionally dropping below freezing, and while not heavy, rain can be frequent.

Administrative divisions

The city is divided into the old and new districts. The latter offer citizens and businesses the chance to move from the bleak and polluted city centre to newly constructed housing estates.

Yanfeng District
Zhuhui District
Shigu District
Zhengxiang District
Nanyue District
Changning City
Leiyang City
Hengyang County
Hengnan County
Hengshan County
Hengdong County
Qidong County

Government

The current CPC Party Secretary of Hengyang is Deng Cequn and the current Mayor is Zhu Jian.

Colleges and universities 
This is a list of institutions with full-time bachelor programs in Hengyang:

 University of South China (南华大学)
 Hengyang Normal University (衡阳师范学院)
 Hunan Institute of Technology (湖南工学院)

Transport

G4 Beijing–Hong Kong and Macau Expressway and G72 Quanzhou–Nanning Expressway intersect here. China National Highway 107 (to Beijing, to Guangzhou) and China National Highway 322 (to Kunming) pass the city centre.

Two bus terminals are located in the city. One is Hengyang Western Terminal which is located in the city centre and operates provincial lines and intra-metro lines in northern and western directions. Another is LingHu Terminal which operates lines of southern and eastern directions and locates on the edge of the city.

Hengyang is an important transport hub in southern China. The Beijing–Guangzhou railway and Hunan–Guangxi railway intersect at Hengyang. Hengyang railway station is one of the ten largest railway stations in China and is recognized as one of the extra-premium level stations. More than 100 trains pass by and stop at Hengyang Railway Station, making it one of the busiest stations all over the country and connecting it to most cities of China.

The city's new Hengyang East railway station is served by the Wuhan–Guangzhou high-speed railway and the Huaihua–Shaoyang–Hengyang railway. The Hengyang Metro is a planned monorail rapid transit system.

Opened in 2014, the city is served by Hengyang Nanyue Airport.

References

External links

 
 Official website of Hengyang Government
 Hengyang Information Network

 
Cities in Hunan
Prefecture-level divisions of Hunan